Warren Eugene Brandon (November 2, 1916 – September 11, 1977) was a California painter and photographer who was born in San Francisco.

Biography 

He studied art at Milligan College and also with Jack Davis, Ralph Ledesma, Jack Feldman, Raymond Brose, and Eliot O'Hara.  In the 1950s and 1960s, he cruised the Pacific Ocean on the Matson Line teaching on ships, as well as in Hawaii.  Other than this, Brandon was a lifelong resident of San Francisco.  In 1964, he was one of four Americans named "Life Fellows of Britain's Royal Society of Artists", and thereafter appended "FRSA" to his signature.  Brandon founded the San Francisco artist cooperative.  He committed suicide in San Francisco on September 11, 1977.

References
 Falk, Peter Hastings, Who was Who in American Art, 1564–1975, Vol I, Sounds View Press, Madison CT, 1999,  p. 421.
 Harold, Margaret, Prize-winning oil Paintings, Book II, Nashville, TN, Allied Publications, 1960
 Hughes, Edan, Artists in California 1786-1940, Sacramento, Crocker Art Museum, 2002.
 San Francisco Chronicle, Sept. 17, 1977 (obituaries)

External links
 Warren Eugene Brandon in AskART

Footnotes

1916 births
1977 deaths
20th-century American painters
American male painters
American Impressionist painters
Artists from Hawaii
Artists from San Francisco
Painters who committed suicide
Milligan University alumni
Suicides in California
1977 suicides
20th-century American male artists